McWilliam is a surname. Notable people with the surname include:

Candia McWilliam (born 1955), Scottish writer
Colin McWilliam (1928–1989), Scottish academic and writer
F. E. McWilliam (1909–1992), British sculptor
George McWilliam (1878–1968), Australian rules footballer
George Roy McWilliam (1905–1977), Canadian politician
James Ormiston McWilliam (1808–1862), Scottish naval surgeon, physician and writer
John McWilliam (Labour politician) (1941–2009), Scottish politician
Peter McWilliam (1879–1951), Scottish footballer
Richard McWilliam (1953–2013), American businessman